Space Invaders is an Australian lifestyle television program which first aired on the Nine Network on 27 February 2021. The series transforms the homes and lives of those who have found themselves in mess and clutter. The series first featured presenters Peter Walsh, Cherie Barber and Lucas Callaghan.

In May 2021, the series was renewed for a second season. The second season began airing on 19 February 2022. In August 2022, Lucas Callaghan was confirmed  not return to the series third season and will be replaced by Angie Kent. The third season premiered on 4 February 2023.

The Team

Peter Walsh - Organisation and decluttering
Cherie Barber - Renovations
Angie Kent - Treasure hunting and upcycling (season 3-)
Lucas Callaghan - Treasure hunting (season 1-2)

Episodes

Season One (2021)

Season Two (2022)

Season Three (2023)

See also
 Your Life on the Lawn
 List of Australian television series

References 

Nine Network original programming
2021 Australian television series debuts